Benson Earle Hill (c. 1795 – 1845) was a nineteenth century English writer, soldier and epicure. In addition to a number of stand alone works he was a contributor to The New Monthly Magazine. He was a correspondent of Leigh Hunt and Charles Dickens.

Bibliography 
 Recollections of an artillery officer: including scenes and adventures in Ireland, America, Flanders and France (1836)
 A Pinch of Snuff: Composed of Curious Particulars and Original Anecdotes of Snuff Taking; ; as well as a review of snuff, snuff-boxes, snuff-shops, snuff-takers, and snuff-papers ; with the moral and physical effects of snuff (1840) as Pollexenes Digit Snift,  Dean of Brazen-Nose London, Robert Tyas.
 The epicure's almanac; or, Diary of good living; containing a choice and original receipt or a valuable hint for every day in the year,  London, How and Parsons, (1841)
 Playing about; or Theatrical anecdotes and adventures, with scenes of general nature, from the life; in England, Scotland, and Ireland, London, (1840)

References 

1795 births
1845 deaths
19th-century English writers